VOEA Savea (P203) was a Pacific Forum patrol vessel operated by the Tongan Maritime Force from 1989 to April 2019.

Background

When the United Nations Convention on the Law of the Sea extended maritime nations' exclusive economic zone (EEZ) to }, Australia designed and built 22 patrol vessels for 12 of its fellow members of the Pacific Forum.  Australia provided the patrol vessel free of charge, and helped build port facilities and provide training.  This allowed its neighbour to exercise sovereignty over their EEZ, intercept smugglers, and poaching fishers, and provide emergency services.

Australia will replace Savea and her two sister ships with two slightly larger and more capable vessels between 2019 and 2020.

Design

The  vessels displace 162 tonnes, and are built using commercial off-the-shelf (COTS) equipment, instead of more expensive, high-performance, military-grade equipment, to ease the maintenance burden, since local maintenance will be performed in small, isolated shipyards.

Operational history

In 1999 Savea carried scientists from the Ministry of Land, Survey, and Natural Resources to study a volcano that emerged from the ocean in early January 1999. The cone was visibly venting fumes. By the time Savea arrived the island had been washed away, but fumes were still venting from underwater vents.

On August 24, 2009, Savea was dispatched to rescue , a yacht in distress.  She was proceeding with her captain and a single crew member. That crew member reported the captain fell overboard, and he did not know how to operate the vessel. In 2009, after 20 years of service, Savea returned to Australia for a major refit.  She underwent another refit in Australia, in October 2017.

References

Savea
Savea